Marshall Mason Strong (September 3, 1813 – March 9, 1864) was an American lawyer, newspaper editor, businessman, and politician from Racine, Wisconsin who served on the Wisconsin Territorial Council (the predecessor of the Wisconsin State Senate) of the Wisconsin Territorial Legislature in 1838–1839 and 1844–1847 from Racine County, including a term as President of the Council. He later spent a single one-year term in 1849 as a Free Soil Party member of the Wisconsin State Assembly from that county.

Background 
Strong was born in Amherst, Massachusetts, on September 3, 1813. His first American ancestor, Elder John Strong, had come to Dorchester, Massachusetts in 1630 from England, and the next five generations in the Strong lineage remained in that state. His father was Hezekiah Wright Strong, a lawyer and the son of Simeon Strong (a Justice of the Supreme Court of Massachusetts). Marshall Strong spent two years at Amherst College from 1830–1832. In late 1832, his father had moved to Troy, New York; Marshall entered Union College in nearby Schenectady, New York, and studied there for an unknown period. He later read the law in Troy, and was admitted to the bar there.

Newspaper and territorial government 
In 1838 he and Lorenzo Janes were among those who combined to found the newspaper the Racine Argus, the first newspaper in Racine County; and he and Janes served as its first editors. Strong was one of the first pair of Councillors from Racine County in 1838–1839. When the Legislature in its 1838 session passed a law incorporating a "University of the Territory of Wisconsin", Strong was among those who were appointed to its Board of Visitors; however, this body (the predecessor of the U.W. board of regents) never actually accomplished anything before statehood.

He resigned from the Council in 1839, and Janes was elected to succeed him.

He served again from 1843–1847, serving as President of the Council from December 5, 1843 to January 6, 1845. He was a delegate to the 1st Wisconsin Constitutional Convention, but resigned from that body and acted as a leader of the successful movement to reject the ratification of the Constitution it had drafted, one he considered too radical in its provisions.

Railroad work 
When the Racine, Janesville and Mississippi Railroad Company, later the Racine and Mississippi Rail Road Company) was incorporated by the legislature April 17, 1852, Strong was one of the incorporators. From 1854–56 he was the corporation's attorney. This line was later merged into the Western Union Railroad Company.

References 

1813 births
1864 deaths
19th-century American newspaper editors
19th-century American newspaper founders
Amherst College alumni
Businesspeople from Wisconsin
Editors of Wisconsin newspapers
New York (state) lawyers
Politicians from Amherst, Massachusetts
Politicians from Troy, New York
People from Racine, Wisconsin
Members of the Wisconsin State Assembly
Members of the Wisconsin Territorial Legislature
19th-century American politicians
Union College (New York) alumni
Wisconsin Free Soilers
Wisconsin lawyers
American male journalists
19th-century American male writers
Journalists from New York (state)
American lawyers admitted to the practice of law by reading law
19th-century American lawyers